Arsène Lupin, Gentleman Burglar is the first collection of stories by Maurice Leblanc recounting the adventures of Arsène Lupin, released on 10 June 1907. It contains the first nine stories depicting the character, first published in the French magazine Je sais tout, the first one being on 15 July 1905. The seventh features English detective Sherlock Holmes, changed in subsequent publications to "Herlock Sholmes" after protests from Arthur Conan Doyle's lawyers, as seen in the second collection Arsène Lupin versus Herlock Sholmes.

Chapters 

 "The Arrest of Arsène Lupin" ("L'Arrestation d'Arsène Lupin") Je sais tout, No. 6, 15 July  1905): During a trip to America, it is learned that famous thief Arsène Lupin has made it aboard the ship. The ship's guests, led by Bernard d'Andrèzy, try to weed out the thief with only a partial description of his appearance and the first letter of the alias he is using. A woman's jewels are stolen and d'Andrèzy courts Miss Nelly. Lupin expert inspector Ganimard is at the ships' destination waiting, and successfully arrests Lupin, who is d'Andrèzy. The jewels, hidden in d'Andrèzy's camera, are knowingly dropped into the water by the now scornful yet still protective Miss Nelly to eliminate the evidence.
 "Arsène Lupin in Prison" ("Arsène Lupin en prison") Je sais tout, No. 11, 15 December 1905, as "The Extraordinary Life of Arsène Lupin in Prison"): Baron Nathan Cahorn receives a letter from Arsène Lupin, who is incarcerated in La Santé Prison, wherein the thief tells Cahorn to send him several of his valuables or else he will come on 27 September to steal those named and more. Cahorn seeks out detective Ganimard, who happens to be on vacation in town, and hires him and two of his men to guard the belongings on the announced date. When the crime occurs, Ganimard asks Cahorn not to tell people he was there and an official investigation is launched, during which Ganimard is called in as the expert on the thief. Ganimard goes to see Lupin in prison, where the thief explains it was he who was hired to watch the night of the crime. Lupin also states that he was only arrested because he was distracted by a woman he loved and declares that he will not be present at his own trial.
 "The Escape of Arsène Lupin" ("L'Évasion d'Arsène Lupin") Je sais tout, No. 12, 15 January 1906, as "The Extraordinary Life of Arsène Lupin: The Escape of Arsene Lupin"): Having learned that Arsène Lupin plans to escape before his trial, the police allow it to happen while secretly watching him in order to arrest his accomplices. However, after a meal, Lupin simply returns to prison, having known he was being tailed already. During the trial Ganimard is convinced that the charged man is not Lupin, but a lookalike. The lookalike had been arrested and released on the same day that Lupin willingly returned to prison. When the lookalike is released, Ganimard tails him only to confront him and realize it was Lupin all along. The thief reveals he made himself look like an imposter through dieting and certain drug injections, and that his colleagues had the actual lookalike arrested that day on purpose.
 "The Mysterious Traveller" ("Le Mystérieux voyageur") Je sais tout, No. 13, 15 February 1906, as "The Extraordinary Life of Arsene Lupin: The Mysterious Traveler")
 "The Queen's Necklace" ("Le Collier de la reine") Je sais tout, No. 15, 15 April 1906, as "The Extraordinary Life of Arsene Lupin: The Queen's Necklace")
"Seven of Hearts" ("Le Sept de cœur") Je sais tout, No. 28, 15 May 1907, as "How I Met Arsene Lupin: The Seven of Hearts")
 "The Safe of Madame Imbert" ("Le Coffre-fort de madame Imbert") Je sais tout, No. 16, 15 May 1906, as "The Extraordinary Life of Arsene Lupin: The Safe of Madame Imbert")
 "The Black Pearl" ("La Perle noire") Je sais tout, No. 18, 15 July 1906, as "The Extraordinary Life of Arsene Lupin: The Black Pearl")
"Sherlock Holmes Arrives Too Late" ("Sherlock Holmès arrive trop tard") Je sais tout, No. 17, 15 June 1906, as "The Extraordinary Life of Arsene Lupin: Sherlock Holmes Arrives Too Late")

Notes

External links

 
 
 Arsène Lupin, Gentleman Burglar on Project Gutenberg
 
 Arsène Lupin, Gentleman Burglar, audio version 

French short story collections
Arsène Lupin novels
1907 short story collections
Works originally published in Je sais tout
Sherlock Holmes